Sac City is a city in and the county seat of Sac County, Iowa, United States, located just southwest of the eastern intersection of U.S. Routes 20 and 71 in the rolling hills along the valley of the North Raccoon River. The city is one of 45 designated Main Street Iowa communities through the Main Street Iowa development program. The population was 2,063 in the 2020 census, a decline from the 2,368 population in 2000.

History
Sac City was first platted in 1855 by Joshua Keith Powell of Fort Dodge, Iowa. The town was so named because the Sac and Fox Indians were in possession of the land at the time of the Louisiana Purchase. The City of Sac City was incorporated 19 years later, in 1874.

Judge Eugene Criss, credited with being the father of Sac City, left Wisconsin and crossed the Mississippi River in the early months of 1855 by covered wagon. He was in search of waterpower and had the desire to establish a settlement in a new and untried country. Deciding upon the North Raccoon River to begin his settlement, Judge Criss proceeded to erect the first log cabin in Sac City, establish himself in the hotel business, as well as keep a stage station and general store for nearby settlers.

As early as 1859, there was talk of building a railroad through Sac County, but the first railroad did not come through Sac City until 1879. The railroad companies refused to lay tracks through undeveloped or mildly developed areas, and Sac City did not meet the requirements. The railroad companies demanded communities be far enough advanced to provide a quick return to capital before they would construct a steam and iron highway through the area. When it came, the railroad benefited Sac City incredibly. The Chicago and North Western Transportation Company connected Sac City, Wall Lake, Auburn, Odebolt, Lake View, Early, and Schaller as well as the cities where crops were sold.

The fair was one of the biggest events of the year and brought people in wagons and buggies from miles around to see the harness races, livestock exhibits, produce, needlework, and art goods.

The Sac City Chautauqua Association was organized in December 1904 with 120 members. The Association brought many fine programs to the community, and because transportation was still slow and laborious, many families stayed in tents on the grounds for the entire Chautauqua session, about eight or nine days. At first the meetings were held in a tent, but by 1908, the citizens of Sac City built a Chautauqua Building in which to hold their meetings, and which is now the only one left of its kind in the state of Iowa.

Modern-day
In May 2017 lifelong Sac City resident and businessman John Criss donated US$5.7 million of his estate to the city for beautification projects.

Geography
Sac City's longitude and latitude coordinates in decimal form are 42.421154, -94.995083.

Climate
Humid continental climate is a climatic region typified by large seasonal temperature differences, with warm to hot (and often humid) summers and cold (sometimes severely cold) winters. Precipitation is relatively well distributed year-round in many areas with this climate.  The Köppen Climate Classification subtype for this climate is "Dfa" (Hot Summer Continental Climate).

Demographics

2010 census
As of the census of 2010, there were 2,220 people, 1,018 households, and 590 families residing in the city. The racial makeup of the city was 98.3% White, 0.1% African American, 0.2% Asian, and 1.3% from two or more races. Hispanic or Latino of any race were 0.2% of the population.

There were 1,018 households, of which 22.7% had children under the age of 18 living with them, 45.9% were married couples living together, 7.5% had a female householder with no husband present, 4.6% had a male householder with no wife present, and 42.0% were non-families. 38.3% of all households were made up of individuals, and 20.1% had someone living alone who was 65 years of age or older. The average household size was 2.10 and the average family size was 2.75.

The median age in the city was 48.8 years. 20.8% of residents were under the age of 18; 5.9% were between the ages of 18 and 24; 18% were from 25 to 44; 28.8% were from 45 to 64; and 26.4% were 65 years of age or older. The gender makeup of the city was 46.2% male and 53.8% female.

2000 census
As of the census of 2000, there were 2,368 people, 1,082 households, and 642 families residing in the city. The racial makeup of the city was 98.61% White, 0.34% African American, 0.04% Native American, 0.08% Asian, 0.34% from other races, and 0.59% from two or more races. Hispanic or Latino of any race were 0.93% of the population.

There were 1,082 households, out of which 21.7% had children under the age of 18 living with them, 48.4% were married couples living together, 7.9% had a female householder with no husband present, and 40.6% were non-families. 37.8% of all households were made up of individuals, and 23.1% had someone living alone who was 65 years of age or older. The average household size was 2.09 and the average family size was 2.70.

19.1% are under the age of 18, 6.9% from 18 to 24, 21.6% from 25 to 44, 23.3% from 45 to 64, and 29.1% who were 65 years of age or older. The median age was 46 years. For every 100 females, there were 84.1 males. For every 100 females age 18 and over, there were 79.3 males.

The median income for a household in the city was $30,300, and the median income for a family was $39,139. Males had a median income of $25,409 versus $19,137 for females. The per capita income for the city was $17,229. About 7.9% of families and 13.6% of the population were below the poverty line, including 23.4% of those under age 18 and 10.8% of those age 65 or over.

Arts and culture

Library
The Sac City Public Library contains over 20,000 volumes, magazines, films, educational, videos, and computers available to the public. Patrons may make use of the children's wing, an adult wing, a periodical room, computer room, group study area, individual study area and the children's activity area. Through association with the Iowa Library Network, additional volumes contained in libraries throughout the state may be obtained.

Landmarks
 Sac County Courthouse - Listed on the National Register of Historic Places
 Sac City Monument Square Historic District - Features a monument to the soldiers of the Union Army
World’s largest popcorn ball - Adjacent to the Sac City Museum

Pop culture
Best Places to Live in Rural America
In February 2007, in its third annual list of the “Best Places to Live in Rural America”, Progressive Farmer magazine placed Sac County as #7 in the overall rankings. In 2009, the magazine ranked Sac County as the tenth "Best Place" in the Midwest Region.

Popcorn ball
Sac City was home to a previous world's largest popcorn ball, which weighed 3,100 pounds and was housed in its own building. A new popcorn ball was created in 2009, weighing 5,060 pounds. On June 18, 2016, volunteers assembled another possible record breaking ball weighing in at 9,370 pounds, now displayed in a new pavilion as a roadside attraction.

Infrastructure

Transportation
Airport
Access to the airport is provided by U.S. Route 20, U.S. Route 71 and County Roads D42 and M54. The Airport is located on  owned by the City of Sac City.

Health care
Loring Hospital in Sac City, Iowa, is a 25-bed Critical Access Hospital serving Sac County and neighboring counties. Loring Hospital opened in September 1950. The hospital began a US$10 million construction and renovation project to address changing health care needs, and prepare for future growth.

Education
The city is served by the East Sac County Community School District. It was a part of the Sac Community School District until July 1, 2011, when it merged into East Sac County.

Notable people 

Earl Dew, jockey
George B. Perkins, businessman and Iowa politician
Doug Shull, former Iowa State legislator
Scott Stanzel, former White House Deputy Press Secretary
Samuel A. Stouffer, social scientist
Eric Swalwell, member of the United States House of Representatives from California
Paul Zahniser, baseball player

See also

U.S. Route 20 in Iowa
U.S. Route 71 in Iowa

Notes

References

External links

City website
East Sac County Schools website
City-Data Comprehensive Statistical Data and more about Sac City

 
Cities in Sac County, Iowa
Cities in Iowa
County seats in Iowa